Atelopus sonsonensis is a species of toad in the family Bufonidae. It is endemic to Colombia and only known from its type locality in Sonsón, Antioquia Department, on the eastern slope of the Cordillera Central at  asl.

Atelopus sonsonensis is a ground-dwelling toad that occurs in the under-storey of forest along streams. It breeds in the streams. Major threats to the species are chytridiomycosis and habitat loss.

References

sonsonensis
Amphibians of the Andes
Amphibians of Colombia
Endemic fauna of Colombia
Amphibians described in 1997
Taxonomy articles created by Polbot